Kentucky Route 173 (KY 173) is a  state highway in Kentucky that runs from KY 7 in rural Elliott County southwest of Sandy Hook to KY 32 in rural Rowan County east of Morehead.

Major intersections

References

0173
Transportation in Elliott County, Kentucky
Transportation in Rowan County, Kentucky